The Abhira dynasty was a dynasty that ruled over the western Deccan, where they succeeded the Satavahanas. From 203 to  roughly 260, they formed a vast kingdom. They belonged to the ancient Abhira tribe. Abhira Era started by Ishwarsena in AD 249, continued with them and was called Abhira-Traikutika era. This era was later continued by Kalachuri Dynasty, calling it Kalachuri era, and later Kalachuri-Chedi era. After the rule of five traikuta kings, they retired to central provinces and assumed the name Haihaya (Chedi) and Kalachuri. Historians call this entire era as Abhira-Traikutika-Kalachuri-Chedi era.

Etymology
The term Abhira (a-bhi+ra+a) literary means one who frightens or causes fear. According to Pran Nath Chopra, The name Abhira may stem from a-bhira—a, not bhira, fear-fearless.

Origin
The Abhiras were from the Yaduvanshi Kshatriya clan. They were among the successors of the Satavahanas in the Western Deccan. Some of them entered the military service of the Western Satraps (Sakas), and helped them in conquest of new territories. By 181 A.D, the Abhiras had gained considerable influence at the Kshatrapa court. Some of them were even serving as generals.

The Gunda inscription dated Saka year 103 (181 CE) refers to Abhira Rudrabhuti as the senapati (commander-in-chief) of the Saka satrap (ruler) Rudrasimha. The inscription also gives a detailed genealogy of the kings up to Rudrasimha:

The inscription refers Rudrasimha to as simply a ksatrapa, ignoring the existence of any mahaksatrapa. According to Sudhakar Chattopadhyaya, this indicates that the Abhira general was the de facto ruler of the state, though not assuming any higher title. The inscription states Abhira Rudrabhuti as the son of the general Bapaka. The Abhira dynasty was probably related Abhira Rudrabhuti.

History

The history of the Abhiras is shrouded in much obscurity. The Abhira dynasty was founded by Ishwarsena. The branch came to power after the demise of the Satavahanas in the Nasik region of Maharashtra, with the help and consent of the Western Satraps (Sakas). They were known as Gavali rajas indicating that they were cowherds by profession before becoming kings. Ten Abhira kings ruled in the Maharashtra region of the Deccan, whose names have not been mentioned in the Puranas.
An Abhira king is known to have sent an embassy to the Sassanid Shahanshah of Persia, Narseh, to congratulate him on his victory against Bahram III.

During the time of the Gupta Empire, the Indian emperor Samudragupta recorded Abhira as a "frontier kingdom" which paid an annual tribute. This was recorded by Samudragupta's Allahabad Pillar inscription, which states the following in lines 22–23. 

The duration of the Abhira rule is uncertain, with most of the Puranas giving it as sixty-seven years, while the Vayu Purana gives it as one hundred and sixty-seven years. According to V.V Mirashi, the following were the feudatories of the Abhiras- 
 The Maharajas of Valkha
 Isvararata
 The kings of Mahishmati
 The Traikutakas

The Abhiras spoke Apabhraṃśa, and seem to have patronized Sanskrit. The Nasik cave inscription of Isvarsena is written mostly in Sanskrit. Several guilds flourished in their kingdom, in which people invested large amounts for making endowments. This indicates peace, order and security in the kingdom of the Abhiras.

Mahaksatrapa Isvaradatta
According to Dr. Bhagwan Lal, The Abhira or Ahir King Ishvardatta entered Gujarat from North Konkan defeated Vijayasena, a Kshatriya and established his supremacy.

Patanjali in his Mahabhashya mentioned about Abhira kings. Abhira chieftains served as Generals to the Saka rulers. In the second century A.D., an Ahir Chief Isvaradatta became the Mahakshatrapa(Supreme King). The Abhira played a key role in causing downfall of Satvahanas in third century A.D.

Saka Satakarni

Another king claiming to be a son of Mathari besides Abhira Ishwarsena is Sakasena. He is identified with Saka Satakarni, whose coins have been found over Andhra Pradesh and is taken to be a Satavahana king and successor of Yajna Sri Satakarni. However, K.Gopalchari thinks that Sakasena was a Abhira king. Reasons:
 The name of Sakasena or Saka Satakarni does not occur in the Puranic genealogies of the Satavahana kings. He claimed to be th son of Mathari, the wife of Abhira Sivadatta, as indicated by his epithet Mathariputra.
 The traditional title of Siri which is found on most coins and inscriptions of the Satavahanas is significantly absent in the case of this ruler.
 Considering the dynastic rivalry between the Saka Kshatrapas, the naming of a Satavahana prince with its main content as Saka is very unnatural and unlikely.
 The Abhiras were earlier in the service of the Saka rulers of Ujjaini, and in those days, feudatory chiefs used to name their sons after the names of their overlords. The name of Sakasena was probably a result of this practice. The suffix of Sena in his name also suggests that he was an Abhira king and related to Ishwarsena.

So this concludes that Ishwarsena's predecessor was his elder brother Sakasena, and Ishwarsena ascended the throne after his death.

Sakasena was probably the first great Abhira king. His inscriptions from the Konkan and coins from Andhra Pradesh suggest that he ruled over a large portion of the Satavahana Empire.

Abhira Ishwarsena
Ishwarsena was the first independent Abhira king. He was the son of Abhira Sivadatta and his wife Mathari. Ashvini Agrawal thinks he was a general in the service of Rudrasimha I who deposed his master in 188 A.D and ascended the throne. Ashvini Agrawal further says that Rudrasimha I soon deposed him and regained the throne in 190 A.D. He (Ishwarsena) started an era which later became known as the Kalachuri-Chedi era. His descendants ruled for nine generations. Ishwarsena's coins are dated only in the first and second years of his reign and are found in Saurashtra and Southern Rajputana.

The Traikuta rule of Aparanta or Konkan  begins in A.D. 248 (Traikuta era) exactly the time of Ishwarsena's rule, hence Traikutas are identified with the Abhira dynasty.

The Abhiras began to rule in Southern and western Sourashtra from the second half of the 10th century A.D their capital was vamanshtali, modern vanthali nine miles west of Junagadh. They became very powerful during the reign of Graharipu who defeated the Saindhavas and the Chaulukyas.

is evident from the epigraphical records of the Yadavas of Devagiri and the Hoysalas that the Abhiras were called Ahuras and Gualas in the 13th century. This proves that the Abhiras, Gopas and Ghoshas were not different people.

List of rulers
The following is the list of the sovereign and strong Abhira rulers-
 Abhira Sivadatta
 Sakasena alias Saka Satakrni
 Abhira Ishwarsena alias Mahaksatrapa Isvaradatta
 Abhira Vashishthiputra Vasusena

Territory
The Abhiras ruled western Maharashtra which included Nasik and its adjoining areas, Aparanta, Lata, Ashmaka, and Khandesh Their core territory included Nasik and the adjoining areas. The Abhira territory also may have consisted of Malwa, which they gradually seized from the Kshahratas.

Decline
After the death of Abhira Vashishthiputra Vasusena, the Abhiras probably lost their sovereign and paramount status. The Abhiras lost most of their domains to the rising Vakatakas (north) and the Kadambas (south-west). The Abhiras were finally supplanted by their feudatories, the Traikutakas. But still many petty Abhira chieftains and kings continued to rule until the fourth century, roughly till 370 AD, in the Vidarbha and Khandesh region. They continued to rule, but without sovereignty, until they came into conflict with the Kadamba king Mayurasarman and were defeated.

Descendants
The descendants of the Abhiras can be recognized by their surnames, such as Ahir, Ahire, Ahir-Rao etc. These surnames are commonly found in Khandesh and Western Maharashtra.
According to Ganga Ram Garg, the modern-day Ahir caste are descendants of Abhira people and the term Ahir is the Prakrit form of the Sanskrit term Abhira. This view gets support in many writings.

A notable Ahir personality, Rao Balbir Singh, the king of Rewari princely state in Haryana, claimed descent from the Abhiras. He spearheaded the Sanskritization of the Ahir community of the larger Yadav caste, establishing the Ahir Yadav Kshatriya Mahasabha.

See also
 Ishwarsena
Satavahana dynasty
Nashik
Traikutaka dynasty

References

Sources
 

Hindu dynasties
History of Maharashtra
Social groups of India